Kracauer, Krakauer, or Krakouer is a German-language surname, a demonym for a person from the Polish city Kraków (German: Krakau). It may refer to:

People
 Siegfried Kracauer (1889–1966), German journalist, sociologist, and film critic
 David Krakauer (musician) (born 1956), American clarinetist
 David Krakauer (scientist) (born 1967), American evolutionary biologist
 John Krakauer, American academic neurologist
 Jon Krakauer (born 1954), American author and mountaineer
 Andrew Krakouer (born 1983), Australian rules footballer
 Andrew L. Krakouer (born 1971), Australian rules footballer
 Grete Wolf Krakauer (1890-1970), Austrian-Israeli artist
 Jim Krakouer (born 1958), Australian rules footballer
 Leopold Krakauer (1890–1954), architect and a painter
 Nathan Krakouer (born 1988), Australian rules footballer
 Phil Krakouer (born 1960), Australian rules footballer

Other uses
 Another name for krakowska, a type of kielbasa (Eastern European sausage)
 Krakauer Brothers, an American piano manufacturer
 The Swiss and Austrian name for Bierschinken, spelled Krakauer

See also 
 Krakow (disambiguation)

German-language surnames
Toponymic surnames
Polish toponymic surnames
German toponymic surnames
Jewish surnames
Yiddish-language surnames
de:Krakauer
es:Krakauer
fr:Krakauer
ru:Кракауэр